Monestier-Merlines is a commune in the Corrèze department in central France.

Geography
The Chavanon forms the commune's southeastern boundary.

Population

See also
Communes of the Corrèze department

References

Communes of Corrèze